The women's doubles was a tennis event held as part of the Tennis at the 1920 Summer Olympics programme. It was the first appearance of the event. 
A total of 18 players, comprising 9 pairs, from 5 nations competed in the event, which was held from 17 to 24 August 1920 at the Beerschot Tennis Club.

Draw

Draw

References

Sources
 
 
  ITF, 2008 Olympic Tennis Event Media Guide

1920

Women's doubles
1920 in women's tennis
Ten